The Toarcian Oceanic Anoxic Event (TOAE), also known as the Jenkyns Event, was a global anoxic event during the early part of the Toarcian age, approximately 183 million years ago, during the Early Jurassic. The TOAE is believed to be possibly the most extreme case of widespread ocean deoxygenation in the entire Phanerozoic eon. It is documented by a high amplitude negative carbon isotope excursion, as well as the widespread deposition of black shales and a major extinction event of marine life associated with a major rise in global temperatures. This anoxic event was responsible for the deposition of commercially extracted oil shales, particularly in China.

Timing 
The TOAE lasted for approximately 500,000 years. The extinction event occurred in two distinct pulses. The first, more recently identified pulse occurred during the mirabile subzone of the tenuicostatum ammonite zone, coinciding with a slight drop in oxygen concentrations and the beginning of warming following a late Pliensbachian cool period. This first pulse, occurring near the Pliensbachian-Toarcian boundary, is sometimes classified as a separate extinction event and referred to as the Pliensbachian-Toarcian boundary event (PTo-E). The main extinction pulse occurred during the elegantulum subzone of the serpentinum ammonite zone, during a marked, pronounced warming interval.

Causes 
The eruption of the Karoo-Ferrar Large Igneous Province and the resulting surge in atmospheric carbon dioxide levels are generally attributed as the mainspring of the TOAE. The large igneous province also intruded into coal seams, releasing even more carbon dioxide and methane than it otherwise would have. Magmatic sills are also known to have intruded into shales rich in organic carbon, causing additional venting of carbon dioxide into the atmosphere. In addition, possible associated release of methane clathrates has been potentially implicated as yet another cause of global warming, though other studies contradict this viewpoint, concluding that the isotopic record is too incomplete to conclusively attribute the isotopic excursion to methane hydrate dissociation, that carbon isotope ratios in belemnites and bulk carbonates are incongruent with the isotopic signature expected from a massive release of methane clathrates, that much of the methane released from ocean sediments was rapidly sequestered, buffering its ability to act as a major positive feedback, and that methane clathrate dissociation occurred too late to have had an appreciable causal impact on the extinction event. Geological, isotopic, and palaeobotanical evidence suggests the late Pliensbachian was an icehouse period. A warming trend lasting from the latest Pliensbachian to the earliest Toarcian was interrupted by a "cold snap" in the middle polymorphum zone, equivalent to the tenuicostatum ammonite zone, which was then followed by the abrupt warming interval associated with the TOAE. It has been hypothesised that the release of cryospheric methane trapped in permafrost amplified the warming and its detrimental effects on marine life. Seawater warmed by anywhere between 3 °C and 7 °C, depending on latitude.

Geochemical evidence from what was then the northwestern European epicontinental sea suggests that a shift from cooler, more saline water conditions to warmer, fresher conditions prompted the development of significant density stratification of the water column and induced anoxia. Further consequences resulting from large igneous province activity included increased silicate weathering and an acceleration of the hydrological cycle, as shown by a greatened amount of terrestrially derived organic matter found in sedimentary rocks of marine origin during the TOAE. The enhanced continental weathering in turn led to increased eutrophication that helped drive the anoxic event in the oceans. Continual transport of continentally weathered nutrients into the ocean enabled high levels of primary productivity to be maintained over the course of the TOAE.

A 2019 geochronological study found that the emplacement of the Karoo-Ferrar large igneous province and the TOAE were not causally linked, and simply happened to occur rather close in time, contradicting mainstream interpretations of the TOAE. The authors of the study conclude that the timeline of the TOAE does not match up with the course of activity of the Karoo-Ferrar magmatic event.

The early stages of the TOAE were accompanied by a decrease in the acidity of seawater following a substantial decrease prior to the TOAE. Seawater pH then dropped close to the middle of the event, strongly acidifying the oceans. The sudden decline of carbonate production during the TOAE is widely believed to be the result of this abrupt episode of ocean acidification. Additionally, the enhanced recycling of phosphorus back into seawater as a result of high temperatures and low seawater pH inhibited its mineralisation into apatite, helping contribute to oceanic anoxia. The abundance of phosphorus in marine environments created a positive feedback loop whose consequence was the further exacerbation of eutrophication and anoxia.

Effects on biogeochemical cycles

Carbon cycle
Occurring during a broader, gradual positive carbon isotope excursion, the TOAE is associated with a global negative carbon isotope excursion recognised in fossil wood, organic carbon, and carbonate carbon in the tenuicostatum ammonite zone of northwestern Europe. The global ubiquity of this negative excursion has been called into question, however, due to its absence in certain deposits from the time, such as the Bächental bituminous marls, though its occurrence in areas like Greece has been cited as evidence of its global nature. The negative excursion has been found to be up to -8% in bulk organic and carbonate carbon, although analysis of compound specific biomarkers suggests a global value of around -3% to -4%. In addition, numerous smaller scale carbon isotope excursions are globally recorded on the falling limb of the larger TOAE carbon isotope excursion. A positive carbon isotope excursion, likely resulting from the mass burial of organic carbon during the anoxic event, is known from the subsequent falciferum ammonite zone.

Sulphur cycle
A positive sulphur isotope excursion in carbonate-associated sulphate occurs synchronously with the positive carbon isotope excursion in carbonate carbon during the falciferum ammonite zone. This positive sulphur isotope excursion has been attributed to the depletion of isotopically light sulphur in the marine sulphate reservoir that resulted from microbial sulphur reduction in anoxic waters.

Effects on life

Marine invertebrates 
The extinction event associated with the TOAE primarily affected marine life as a result the collapse of the carbonate factory. Brachiopods were particularly severely hit, with the TOAE representing one of the most dire crises in their evolutionary history. Uniquely, the brachiopod genus Soaresirhynchia thrived during the later stages of the TOAE due to its low metabolic rate and slow rate of growth, making it a disaster taxon. Ostracods also suffered a major diversity loss, with almost all ostracod clades’ distributions during the time interval corresponding to the serpentinum zone shifting towards higher latitudes to escape intolerably hot conditions near the Equator. Other affected invertebrate groups included bivalves, corals, ammonoids, echinoderms, radiolarians, dinoflagellates, and foraminifera.

Marine vertebrates 
The TOAE had minor effects on marine reptiles, in stark contrast to the major impact it had on many clades of marine invertebrates.

Terrestrial vertebrates 
The TOAE is suggested to have caused the extinction of various clades of dinosaurs, including coelophysids, dilophosaurids, and many basal sauropodomorph clades, as a consequence of the remodelling of terrestrial ecosystems caused by global climate change. In the wake of the extinction event, many derived clades of ornithischians, sauropods, and theropods emerged, with most of these post-extinction clades greatly increasing in size relative to dinosaurs before the TOAE.

Terrestrial plants 
The volcanogenic extinction event initially impacted terrestrial ecosystems more severely than marine ones. A shift towards a low diversity assemblage of cheirolepid conifers, cycads, and Cerebropollenites-producers adapted for high aridity from a higher diversity ecological assemblage of lycophytes, conifers, seed ferns, and wet-adapted ferns is observed in the palaeobotanical and palynological record over the course of the TOAE.

Palaeogeographic changes 
During the anoxic event, the Sichuan Basin was transformed into a giant lake, which was believed to be approximately thrice as large as modern-day Lake Superior. Lacustrine sediments deposited as a result of this lake's existence are represented by the Da’anzhai Member of the Ziliujing Formation. Roughly ∼460 gigatons (Gt) of organic carbon and ∼1,200 Gt of inorganic carbon were likely sequestered by this lake over the course of the TOAE.

Comparison with present global warming 

The TOAE and the Palaeocene-Eocene Thermal Maximum have been proposed as analogues to modern anthropogenic global warming based on the comparable quantity of greenhouse gases released into the atmosphere in all three events. Some researchers argue that evidence for a major increase in Tethyan tropical cyclone intensity during the TOAE suggests that a similar increase in magnitude of tropical storms is bound to occur as a consequence of present climate change.

See also 

 Bonarelli Event
 Selli Event

References 

Extinction events
Toarcian Stage